Blood Ties (还魂; Taiwan name:頭七還魂夜) is a Singaporean film in Chinese directed by Chai Yee Wei and released in 2009.

Plot
Gangs bribed policeman Shun's boss Woon sir and friend Shen, then raped his wife Ah Mei and killed both. Within the week after their death, Shun and Ah Mei controlled the bodies of Shun 's younger sister Qing and mother Madam Lee to take revenge on those people involved.

Cast

References 
Blood Ties (2009)
Blood Ties (Huan hun) DVD (2009) || movieXclusive.com

External links

Singaporean horror films
2009 films
2000s Mandarin-language films
2009 horror films